La'bi is the esoteric ritual language of male initiation among the Gbaya Kara, the Mbum, and some Sara Laka, in the area of Touboro near where the CAR, Chad, and Cameroon meet. It has no native speakers. It is related to Mbum, with substantial loans from one or more Sara languages.

A word list of is given in Periquet (1915).

References

Languages of Cameroon
Initiation languages
Mbum–Day languages